"Tapout" is a song by American hip hop group Rich Gang featuring rappers Lil Wayne, Birdman, Mack Maine, Nicki Minaj and Future. The song was the first single off of the YMCMB compilation album, Rich Gang.  The song is produced by Southside & TM88 and is co-produced by Detail. It also features uncredited vocals from its co-producer, Noel "Detail" Fisher. The song was premiered on March 12, 2013, and was available for digital download on March 19. The song has since peaked at #44 on the Billboard Hot 100.

Background 
Birdman confirmed the release of the song on March 12, 2013, and was released that day as planned. The song premiered on Hot 97 with Funkmaster Flex on March 12, 2013. It was officially released as a digital download on March 19, 2013. The song was available as a digital download in UK on March 24, and in France on March 25. On May 7, "Tapout" was released to rhythmic contemporary radio.

Music video 
Nicki Minaj confirmed a video shoot on March 11, 2013 but it was unknown for what song. Birdman confirmed on his Twitter that the video shoot was for "Tapout". The video (directed by Hannah Lux Davis) was released on May 5, 2013 and featured cameos from Kimora Lee Simmons, DJ Khaled, Bow Wow, Paris Hilton, Rocko and Christina Milian.

Critical reception 
"Tapout" was met with generally positive reviews from music critics. Dan Rys of XXL said, "With Future on the hook, the song was always going to be a memorable club staple, but the best thing about it is how everyone on it—Lil Wayne, Birdman, Mack Maine, Nicki Minaj and Detail—grabs the beat and puts their own individual stamp on it." David Jeffries of AllMusic stated, ""Tapout" is an all-star bit of flash that brings Future back to mix with the label's A-list."

XXL ranked it at number 18 on their list of the best songs of 2013. They commented saying, "Wayne kicks things off with a verse that, while not the most original, was still entertaining, while Birdman carries the bridge to the only part that really matters, and the only part that keeps this song on the list: Nicki Minaj. Here's to nominating "Pull up in that you can't afford this / Only rap bitch on the Forbes list" for couplet of the year. That and, of course, that hook is infectious as hell."

Chart performance
The song has peaked at number 134 in France and at number 40 on in Belgium, becoming Birdman and Mack Maine's first entries in those countries.

Weekly charts

Year-end charts

Certifications

Release history

References 

2013 singles
2013 songs
Lil Wayne songs
Nicki Minaj songs
Birdman (rapper) songs
Mack Maine songs
Future (rapper) songs
Cash Money Records singles
Republic Records singles
Music videos directed by Hannah Lux Davis
Songs written by Nicki Minaj
Songs written by Lil Wayne
Songs written by Detail (record producer)
Song recordings produced by Detail (record producer)
Songs written by Future (rapper)
Songs written by Southside (record producer)
Songs written by TM88